Chiton magnificus, the liquorice sea cradle, is a Southeast Pacific species of edible chiton, a marine polyplacophoran mollusk in the family Chitonidae, the typical chitons.

Description
It is shiny and very dark bluish-grey.

Distribution and habitat
The distribution of Chiton magnificus ranges along the Pacific coast of South America from Cape Horn in Chile to San Lorenzo Island in Peru. Although there are old claimed records of this species from the Galápagos Islands, these are now considered incorrect.

This species is found in places with strong current along rocky coasts, including pools.

Human use
Chiton magnificus is edible.

References

External links
 MNHN

Chitonidae
Edible molluscs
Western South American coastal fauna
Molluscs of South America
Molluscs described in 1844